Randomizer most often refers to:
 Scrambler, a telecommunications device
 Video game randomizers